Main Street is a 1956 Spanish drama film directed by Juan Antonio Bardem starring Betsy Blair and José Suárez. It is based on a Carlos Arniches play titled La señorita de Trévelez. Shooting locations were Palencia, Cuenca and Logroño. The film won the FIPRESCI Award at the Venice Film Festival.

Plot
Isabel is a good-natured and sensible unmarried woman who lives in a small town with her widowed mother. At the age of 35, she is losing all hope of getting married and having children.

A group of bored middle-aged friends decides to play a trick on Isabel: Juan, the youngest and most handsome of them, will pretend to fall in love with her. As Isabel lives the courtship, full of hope and joy, Juan realizes too late the cruelty of the situation, but, pushed by his buddies, doesn't dare tell Isabel the truth.

When the day of the gala dance at the town's club comes, Isabel is still living her dream of love. She expects her engagement to be publicly announced from the stage, but Juan, desperate, tries to do anything to shy away from the muddle.

Cast
 Betsy Blair (dubbed into Spanish by Elsa Fábregas) as Isabel
 José Suárez as Juan
 Yves Massard as Federico
 Luis Peña as Luis
 Dora Doll as Toña
 Alfonso Godá as José María, 'Pepe el Calvo'
 Manuel Alexandre as Luciano
 José Calvo as Doctor
 Matilde Muñoz Sampedro as Chacha
 René Blancard as Editor

Background

Similarities between Calle Mayor story and environment and Federico Fellini's I Vitelloni have been pointed out. Calle Mayor was Blair's first performance outside the US.

The name of the role played by Yves Massard was Bardem's homage to "Federico Sánchez", a pseudonym under which Jorge Semprún managed the clandestine activities of the Communist Party of Spain (PCE). Bardem was a well-known member of the PCE.

The film was selected as the Spanish entry for the Best Foreign Language Film at the 30th Academy Awards, but was not accepted as a nominee.

Sequel

Seven years after Calle Mayor, Bardem wrote and directed Nunca pasa nada (Nothing Ever Happens), which depicts an environment and characters similar to those in Calle Mayor, to the point that some critics nicknamed it disdainfully Calle Menor (Minor street).

See also
 The Lady from Trévelez (1936)
 List of submissions to the 30th Academy Awards for Best Foreign Language Film
 List of Spanish submissions for the Academy Award for Best Foreign Language Film

References

External links
 

1956 films
1956 drama films
Spanish drama films
1950s Spanish-language films
Spanish black-and-white films
Films set in Spain
Films based on works by Carlos Arniches
Films directed by Juan Antonio Bardem
Spanish films based on plays
Remakes of Spanish films
Films scored by Joseph Kosma